Touvarno Pinas (born November 25, 1985) is a Dutch footballer who plays as a left wingback for DWS.

Honours
Toto Cup
Winner (1): 2012-13
Liga Leumit
Winner (1): 2013-14
Israel State Cup
Runner-up (1): 2014
Israeli Premier League
Runner-up (1): 2014-15

Personal life
He holds a Dutch passport.

References

1985 births
Living people
People from Wanica District
Surinamese emigrants to the Netherlands
Dutch footballers
Dutch expatriate footballers
RKC Waalwijk players
Almere City FC players
SC Telstar players
Eredivisie players
Eerste Divisie players
Maccabi Netanya F.C. players
Hapoel Haifa F.C. players
Hapoel Ironi Kiryat Shmona F.C. players
Hapoel Ramat Gan F.C. players
AFC DWS players
Israeli Premier League players
Liga Leumit players
Expatriate footballers in Israel
Surinamese expatriate sportspeople in Israel
Association football defenders
Association football midfielders
OFC Oostzaan players